Christ Church (Episcopal), Shrewsbury is a historic church building at the junction of Broad Street and Sycamore Avenue in Shrewsbury, New Jersey,  It was built in 1769 and added to the National Register of Historic Places in 1995.

References

External links
Official website

Episcopal church buildings in New Jersey
Churches on the National Register of Historic Places in New Jersey
Georgian architecture in New Jersey
Churches completed in 1769
Churches in Monmouth County, New Jersey
18th-century Episcopal church buildings
National Register of Historic Places in Monmouth County, New Jersey
New Jersey Register of Historic Places
Shrewsbury, New Jersey